Joey is an American sitcom created by Scott Silveri and Shana Goldberg-Meehan. It is a spin-off/sequel to Friends, with Matt LeBlanc reprising his role as Joey Tribbiani. It premiered on NBC on September 9, 2004. Midway through the second season, the show was placed on a hiatus but returned on March 7, 2006. Only one episode aired before the show was pulled when it was overshadowed in ratings by American Idol. NBC canceled the series due to low ratings on August 23, 2006.

Overview
The series centers on Joey Tribbiani, who has struck out on his own and moved to Hollywood, hoping to truly make it as an actor. After reuniting with his high-strung sister, Gina, a hairdresser, Joey moves in with his genius twenty-year-old nephew Michael, who is a rocket scientist. He begins a tentative romance with his superintendent, Alexis Garrett, and becomes close friends with fellow aspiring actor Zach Miller.

Cast and characters

 Matt LeBlanc as Joey Tribbiani, a struggling actor and food lover who becomes famous for his role on Days of Our Lives as Dr. Drake Ramoray. Joey is a womanizer with many girlfriends throughout the series, in keeping with his character on Friends. The series roughly picks up where Friends left off, with Joey at the beginning of the show making a move from New York to Los Angeles to proceed with his acting career. He is constantly talking about food or eating sandwiches or pizza.
 Drea de Matteo as Gina Tribbiani, Joey's older sister, who is temperamental and promiscuous. Gina is not too bright, yet very street-wise; she is a caring but over-protective and domineering mother. For years, she convinced her genius son, Michael, that he was born when she was 22 instead of sixteen years old, and always says he is the one thing she has done well. She and Joey are friends in addition to being siblings, both having the gift of being extremely appealing to the opposite sex, with numerous lovers. Initially working as a hairdresser, by season two, she works as a secretary for Joey's agent, Bobbie, having impressed Bobbie with her brash manner. In season two, she starts dating Michael's father, Jimmy, once again. In the season-two episode "Joey and the Holding Hands", it is implied that Gina may be bisexual.
 Andrea Anders as Alexis "Alex" Garrett, Joey's next-door neighbor, landlady, and friend. She is an educated, yet slightly ditzy, blonde lawyer who graduated from Northwestern University and Pepperdine University School of Law. Initially intimidated but also intrigued by Joey's tough street-wise older sister, Gina, the two women eventually become friends and she becomes bolder in the way she dresses and acts, thanks to Gina's influence. She is puzzled but impressed by Joey's intuitive gift of knowing when she is wearing thong panties and spends most of her time hanging out at Joey and Michael's apartment. She and Joey bond and become close friends. Her husband is a professional orchestra musician and is away from home most of the time, and she confides her problems with her marriage in Joey. At the end of season one, she and Joey become romantically involved during her separation from her husband. In season two, she becomes romantically interested in Joey and has a crush on him for a long period. Gina tries to help her get over Joey, but once Alex starts dating Joey's friend Dean, Joey soon realizes that he is also in love with Alex. Shortly after the series ended, Anders and LeBlanc entered a relationship for nine years.
 Paulo Costanzo as Michael Tribbiani, Joey's nephew, who idolizes Joey's ability to date many women and who himself is sheltered and nervous around girls. He is self-conscious that he has been so sheltered and that his mother, Gina, breastfed him until he was seven. Early in the second season, it is revealed that Michael has Asperger syndrome. He is a huge Star Trek: The Next Generation and Star Wars fan. He is extremely intelligent, an aerospace engineer, attends Caltech, and specialises in applied thermodynamics. He works with his rival, Seth, on engineering projects, and is an obvious direct opposite from his more street-wise mother and uncle. He turns to Joey as a big brother and substitute father figure, even after his biological father, Jimmy, re-enters Gina's love life.
 Jennifer Coolidge as Roberta "Bobbie" Morganstern, Joey's agent and reportedly the twelfth most powerful woman in Hollywood. She has an enormous crush on Joey's nephew, Michael. She often entertains herself by making her office assistant do funny tricks or shocking herself with a stun-gun. She is brash, forward, aggressive, highly entertaining, and slightly ditzy, laughing at everything and at anyone's expense, including her client Joey's. She was once sued by Phil Collins.
 Miguel A. Núñez Jr. as Zach Miller (season 2), an actor and amateur play director who becomes close friends with Joey. Zach does not appear to have a home; he was seen at one time living in Joey's trailer while working on a major blockbuster movie. In one episode, Zach and Joey, both drunk, get married in Tijuana, possibly a parody of Ross and Rachel marrying each other in the season-five finale of Friends. Zach's final appearance was in "Joey and the Big Move". Núñez was absent from the last five episodes, including the finale of the series, because he found another job.
 Ben Falcone as Howard Peckerman, Joey's friend and neighbor.

Several cast members had previously appeared as different characters in Friends: Coolidge appeared as Amanda, an old friend of Monica and Phoebe, in a tenth-season episode. Adam Goldberg, who played Jimmy, appeared in the second season of Friends in the recurring role of Eddie, who moves in with Chandler after Joey moves out. Carlos Gómez, who played Sam the director, appeared in one episode of Friends as the restaurant worker Julio in "The One with All the Jealousy". Patrick Kerr, who played the producer of the Daytime Soap Awards, appeared in one episode of Friends as a restaurant manager who auditions Monica for a job as a chef. Brent Spiner, who played himself, appeared in one episode of Friends as James Campbell, who interviews Rachel for a job.

Additionally, Robert Costanzo reprised his role as Joey's father, Joey Tribbiani Sr., who originated in the first season of Friends, in "Joey and the Dad", making Costanzo the only actor besides LeBlanc to play the same character in both series, since Gina and Mary Theresa both appeared in a third-season episode of Friends, but were not played by Drea de Matteo and Christina Ricci, respectively. Simon Helberg appeared in four episodes as Seth Tobin, a nerdy engineer and friend/rival of Michael who shared many similarities with one of Helberg's later characters, Howard Wolowitz, in The Big Bang Theory. David Schwimmer, who previously portrayed Ross Geller and directed several episodes of Friends, returned to direct two episodes of Joey.

Background and development
After the series finale of Friends in 2004, LeBlanc signed on for the spin-off series, Joey, following Joey's move to Los Angeles to pursue his acting career. Friends producers Marta Kauffman and David Crane were not interested in the spin-off, although Kevin S. Bright agreed to be executive producer, along with Joey creators Scott Silveri and Shana Goldberg-Meehan, the latter of whom left the show after the first season and was replaced by Jon Pollack.

The pilot episode was released in screener for test audiences and members of the entertainment industry to preview the show and drum up business. The screener was subsequently leaked on the internet and thus has received a much wider critical review process than initially conceived. There were few differences between the unbroadcast pilot and the version that was broadcast. Ashley Scott played the role of Allison in the unbroadcast pilot but was replaced by Andrea Anders, and the character name changed to Alex.

The series did well in the Nielsen ratings in its first season (2004–2005) and was subsequently renewed for a second season (2005–2006). In the second season, Miguel A. Núñez Jr. was added to the show as a series regular and Jennifer Coolidge had a more prominent role. The show was pulled from its Thursday-night timeslot in December 2005 and NBC returned it in a new timeslot (Tuesdays at 8pm) on March 7, 2006. Due in part to being in competition with American Idol, Joey was the lowest-rated prime time program of the week for NBC. The network pulled the series after the first Tuesday broadcast, and its cancellation was announced on May 15, 2006. The remaining episodes have never been broadcast by NBC but have been shown on various other networks around the world. Episode 5 and Episode 13 of season one were directed by David Schwimmer, who played Ross Geller in Friends. NBC heavily promoted Joey and gave it Friends' Thursday 8:00 pm timeslot. The pilot was watched by 18.6 million American viewers, but ratings continually decreased throughout the series' two seasons, averaging 10.20 million viewers in the first season and 7.10 million in the second. The final broadcast episode, on March 7, 2006, was watched by 4.1 million viewers; NBC canceled the series on May 15, 2006, after two seasons. Bright blamed the collaboration between NBC executives, the studio, and other producers for quickly ruining the series:

Episodes

Series overview

Season 1 (2004–05)

Season 2 (2005–06) 

First broadcast in Ireland on RTÉ Two
First broadcast in Latin America on WBTV and Norway on TV 2
First broadcast in Latin America on WBTV

International airings
In Brazil, the show premiered on November 2, 2004, and it was first aired on Warner Channel. The entire series was broadcast. Two years later, it also premiered on terrestrial television channel SBT, under the name Vida de Artista ("Artist's Life"). The show was also screened in New Zealand on TV2 and in Australia on the Nine Network. In the United Kingdom, it aired on Channel 5.

Reception and cancellation
Joey premiered on NBC on September 9, 2004, as part of the network's Thursday-night comedy lineup. Although the series was not well received by critics, the pilot episode attracted 18.6 million viewers. As the first season progressed, ratings fell but remained average (10.1 million viewers). NBC renewed the series for a second season and moved it to Tuesday nights, opposite Fox's highly rated American Idol.

Ratings for the second season fell to an all-time low (4.1 million viewers), and NBC put the show on hiatus in March 2006. The network officially canceled the show in May 2006, citing low ratings.

Nielsen ratings

Awards and nominations
Joey won the People's Choice Award for Favorite New Television Comedy, and Matt LeBlanc won Favorite Male Television Star. LeBlanc was also nominated for the Golden Globe Award for Best Actor – Television Series Musical or Comedy.

Aftermath
After the series' cancellation in 2006, Matt LeBlanc took a four-year break from acting, before returning in the BBC Two/Showtime sitcom Episodes. The series was a success for the actor, earning him a Golden Globe Award for Best Actor – Television Series Musical or Comedy in 2012. On the show, he plays a fictionalized version of himself. Joey is brought up several times in conversation by characters on the show, including LeBlanc, most notably when he questions the accuracy of the audience research commissioned by TV networks with the line "Research said Joey was going to be a hit".

References

External links
 

2000s American sitcoms
2004 American television series debuts
2006 American television series endings
English-language television shows
Friends (1994 TV series)
NBC original programming
Television shows set in Los Angeles
American television spin-offs
American sequel television series
Television series about actors
Television series about siblings
Television series by Warner Bros. Television Studios
Works about Italian-American culture